The Return of Dracula is a 1958 American horror film directed by Paul Landres, and starring Francis Lederer, Norma Eberhardt, and Ray Stricklyn. It follows Dracula, who murders an artist aboard a train in Central Europe, and proceeds to impersonate the man, traveling to meet with his extended family in a small California town. The film is primarily in black and white, aside from one brief color sequence.

It is one of a handful of horror films that use the melody of "Dies Irae" as its opening theme tune. Others include The Shining, The Car and The Mephisto Waltz.

It was released in Los Angeles as a double feature with The Flame Barrier on May 21, 1958.

Plot 
In Central Europe, Investigator John Meierman and several assistants attempt to trap Count Dracula inside his tomb in a cemetery, but upon opening his casket, they find it empty. Nearby, Dracula, who has fled, boards a train. He murders Bellac Gordal, a Czech artist en route to the United States to visit his extended family in the small community of Carleton, California. Dracula proceeds to impersonate Bellac, assuming his identity. After arriving in California, Dracula, posing as Bellac, is met by Bellac's widowed cousin, Cora, and her children, the young Mickey, and teenaged Rachel. Rachel is especially eager to meet her cousin, as she has a shared passion for art, specifically clothing design. The family quickly finds Bellac's behavior eccentric, as he maintains a social detachment from them. The day after Bellac's arrival, Mickey's beloved cat goes missing and is subsequently found mutilated in an abandoned mineshaft.

Unbeknownst to the others, Bellac has established a secret resting place in the abandoned mine, replete with a coffin where he goes to sleep. Rachel is disappointed by his absence one day, as she hoped to show him the town, but she eventually meets him at dusk— he explains he spent the day painting. Rachel departs to her night shift at the local parish house, where she tends to elderly and infirm residents, including a blind woman, Jennie. After Rachel finishes her shift, Bellac awakens Jennie, who offers to give her the ability of sight before biting her neck.

In the morning, Rachel is beckoned to the parish house and is driven there by her boyfriend, Tim. Rachel finds Jennie feverish and hysterical upon arriving, claiming a man entered her room through the window. When she attempts to get out of bed, Jennie collapses and dies. After Jennie's funeral, Cora and Rachel are approached by Mack Bryant, a detective appointed by Meierman. He asks about cousin Bellac and mentions that an unidentified man was thrown from a train to his death in Germany. Bellac appears at the home, and Bryant examines his immigration records and passport before meeting with Meierman outside to divulge his findings.

Bellac visits Jennie's tomb in the mausoleum and awakens her from the dead. Later, Bryant hears Jennie's voice beckoning him in the woods near the train station. When he goes to investigate, he is fatally mauled by a white wolf (portrayed by a white German Shepherd Dog). That night, Rachel invites Bellac to attend a Halloween costume party at the parish house the following day, but Bellac declines. Rachel confronts Bellac about his isolation from the family, but he remains evasive. Rachel later falls asleep while reading and has what seems to be a nightmare in which Bellac asks her to remove Jennie's crucifix pendant from her neck and offers her eternal life. In the morning, Rachel finds the crucifix lying on the floor, suspecting it was not a dream.

Meierman visits the parish house and confronts Reverend Whitfield with his findings. Meanwhile, before departing for the Halloween party, Rachel finds a portrait of herself in Bellac's room depicting her inside a coffin. When Bellac appears downstairs, Rachel grows terrified when she realizes his reflection does not appear in a mirror. Tim arrives moments later, and Rachel leaves with him to the party in a trance-like state. Whitfield and Meierman confront Rachel at the party, asking her to help them entrap Bellac. After finding Jennie's crypt empty, Meierman, Whitfield, and other police stake out the cemetery, where they soon witness Jennie returning to her crypt. Simultaneously, Rachel leaves the party and flees to the abandoned mineshaft to visit Bellac. As Meierman drives a stake through Jennie's heart, killing her, Bellac collapses before Rachel. Tim arrives at the mineshaft, having followed Rachel there, and finds her hysterical. Tim attempts to escort Rachel out of the mine, but Bellac blocks their exit. Bellac momentarily hypnotizes Tim, but Tim approaches him with Jennie's crucifix, forcing Bellac to fall into a shaft below. He is impaled through the back and chest on a large wooden post and disintegrates into a clothed skeleton.

Cast

Production 
Filming of The Return of Dracula took place in October 1957.

Release
The Return of Dracula premiered theatrically in Los Angeles on May 21, 1958 as a double feature with The Flame Barrier. To promote the film, United Artists advertised that 12 insurance companies had refused to assume any liability risk for those admitted to see the feature.

When shown on U.S. television, it was retitled Curse of Dracula. In the UK, it was released theatrically as The Fantastic Disappearing Man. Later in 1958, the Hammer film Horror of Dracula appeared in theaters in both the UK and the U.S. and The Return of Dracula was eclipsed as a result, due to Christopher Lee's new stardom as the Count.

Critical response
Geoffrey M. Warren of the Los Angeles Times dismissed the film, writing that it "could have been put off indefinitely and no one would have ever known."

Home video
The Return of Dracula was released on DVD by MGM in 2007 as a Midnite Movies Double Feature with Landres' previous film, The Vampire (1957). It was re-released on DVD as an exclusive release from BestBuy.

Legacy
On October 27, 1971, Lederer reprised his role of Count Dracula on an episode of Night Gallery titled "The Devil Is Not Mocked". In this story, Dracula tells his grandson how he fought the Nazis during World War II.

See also
 List of American films of 1958

References

External links
 

 
 

1958 films
1958 horror films
American black-and-white films
American supernatural horror films
American vampire films
Dracula films
American films about Halloween
Films scored by Gerald Fried
Films directed by Paul Landres
Films set in California
United Artists films
1950s English-language films
1950s American films